Qlippoth may refer to:

 Qliphoth, the representations of evil forces in the mystical teachings of Judaism, such as in the Kabbalah
 One of the character types in Dead Inside
 Primordial monsters of the Abyss in the Pathfinder Roleplaying Game